Yuriy Mikhaylovich Poyarkov (10 February 1937, in Kharkiv – 10 February 2017, in Kharkiv) was a Ukrainian volleyball player who competed for the Soviet Union in the 1964 Summer Olympics,  in the 1968 Summer Olympics, and in the 1972 Summer Olympics.

Career
In 1964, he was part of the Soviet team which won the gold medal in the Olympic tournament. He played eight matches.

Four years later he won his second gold medal with the Soviet team in the 1968 Olympic Games tournament. He played all nine matches.

At the 1972 Olympic Games he was a member of the Soviet team that won the bronze medal in the Olympic tournament. He played three matches.

He died on his 80th birthday, on 10 February 2017.

References

External links
 
 

1937 births
2017 deaths
Soviet men's volleyball players
Olympic volleyball players of the Soviet Union
Volleyball players at the 1964 Summer Olympics
Volleyball players at the 1968 Summer Olympics
Volleyball players at the 1972 Summer Olympics
Olympic gold medalists for the Soviet Union
Olympic bronze medalists for the Soviet Union
Olympic medalists in volleyball
Ukrainian men's volleyball players
Sportspeople from Kharkiv
Medalists at the 1972 Summer Olympics
Medalists at the 1968 Summer Olympics
Medalists at the 1964 Summer Olympics
Honoured Masters of Sport of the USSR